Acalyptris heteranthes is a moth of the family Nepticulidae. It was described by Edward Meyrick in 1926. It is known from Karwar, India.

References

Nepticulidae
Endemic fauna of India
Moths of Asia
Moths described in 1926